Mitochondrial inner membrane protein is a protein that in humans is encoded by the IMMT gene.)

IMMT encodes an inner mitochondrial membrane (IMM) protein in the nucleus. It is posttranslational transported to the IMM. Mic60/Mitofilin (encoded by the IMMT gene) is a core subunit of the MICOS-complex, directly located next to cristae junctions (CJ). Human Mic60 exists in two isoforms of different size, anchored to the IMM via its N-terminus, while most of the protein is located to the inner mitochondrial space (IMS).

Function 
Mic60 is evolutionary one of the oldest MICOS subunits as homologous were found in anaerobic prokaryotes. It is mainly present in two isoforms (ca. 88 and 90 kDa). In the brain, four isoforms are known, which differ in their isoelectric point due to different post-translational modifications. The amino terminus of Mic60 is anchored in the IM, while most of the protein is extended to the IMS. C-terminal Mic60 has a conserved mitofilin domain which is crucial for building the MICOS-complex. A central coiled-coil domain is required to enable protein-protein interactions.

Interactions 
Mic60 indirectly interacts with all known MICOS-complex and SAM complex components. It directly interacts with Mic25, Mic19 and SAM50. Together with Mic25 and Mic19, Mic60 forms the Mic60-Mic19-Mic25 subcomplex. This subcomplex, especially Mic60, is crucial for the physical contact between the IMM and the outer mitochondrial membrane (OMM) via its interaction with SAM50. Mic60 also interacts with the translocase of the OMM (TOM) and the translocase of the IMM (TIM) to ensure the localization of Mic60 near to CJs. Through its interaction with TOM and TIM, Mic60 additionally influences the import of precursor proteins.

Localisation/Import 
Mic60 is translated in the cytosol and translocated into the IMS via TOMM40. TIMM23 transports Mic60 into the IM, where a mitochondrial processing peptidase (MPP) cleaves of the N-terminal mitochondrial targeting signal (MTS). Mic60 is anchored in the IMM through its transmembrane (TM) domain.

Interactions
IMMT has been shown to interact with BAT2.)

References

Further reading